Organizer may refer to:

Job descriptions
Community organizer, an advocate leading or seeking to lead or influence a community seeking changes in government, corporations and/or other institutions
Event manager, a person who organizes an event
Party organizer, a political party official
Professional organizer, a person who helps others get organized
Union organizer, a trade union official

Arts and media
Organiser (newspaper), an Indian newspaper launched in 1947
The Organizer, a 1963 film co-written and directed by Mario Monicelli
 The Organizer (album)

Other uses
Personal organizer, a type of diary
Electronic organizer, an electronic version of an organizer
Open Programming Language, initially called Organiser Programming Language
Spemann-Mangold organizer, also called embryonic induction, a cell or tissue which sends signals to other cells to instruct the fate of these cells
 Organizer box

See also
 Organization (disambiguation)
 Organizing (disambiguation)